Worth Matravers is a village and civil parish in the English county of Dorset. The village is situated on the cliffs west of Swanage. It comprises limestone cottages and farm houses and is built around a pond, which is a regular feature on postcards of the Isle of Purbeck.

The civil parish stretches from the coast northwards to, and just beyond, the A351 road from Corfe Castle to Swanage. The village of Worth Matravers is situated on side roads towards the south of the parish, which also includes the village of Harman's Cross on the main road to the north.

The cliffs of Worth Matravers were the site of a Chain Home radar station during World War II, which was instrumental in the development of radar when the Telecommunications Research Establishment outstation shared the site from 1940 until 1942 when it was relocated to Malvern, Worcestershire.

Geography
To the south of Worth Matravers village are the limestone cliffs of the English Channel coast. These are situated on the South West Coast Path and are part of the Jurassic Coast World Heritage Site. This coastline is popular with tourists in the summer months, with the rocky beaches of Winspit, Seacombe and Chapman's Pool situated within walking distance of the village.

To the north of the village and parish are the chalk Purbeck Hills. Many tourists pass through this area on the Swanage Railway, a steam locomotive operated heritage railway. Harman's Cross railway station on that railway is within the parish boundaries, but a significant distance from the village centre of Worth Matravers.

The parish includes the settlement of Harman's Cross to the north, and has an area of 10.98 square kilometres. In the 2011 census it had 285 households and a population of 638. The parish formed part of the Purbeck local government district until its replacement by the Dorset unitary authority in April 2019. It is located within the South Dorset constituency of the House of Commons. Prior to Brexit in 2020, it was in the South West England constituency of the European Parliament.

Economy
Traditionally the village's economy was based on farming, quarrying and fishing. Today, two quarries – Swanworth and St Aldhelm's – are still in operation. Both arable and pasture farming are still central to the village's economy.

In March 2022, it was announced that the National Trust had purchased the 350 acre Weston Farm, in the village, adding to its other landholdings in the village and its vicinity such as Spyway.

Places of interest

A Royal Observer Corps monitoring post is situated in the layby on the road to Worth Matravers.

About a mile from the village is Winspit, an old quarry on the cliffs. This was used as a filming location for an episode of Blake's 7 and also in two Doctor Who stories.

On the bluff of the headland is the Norman Saint Aldhelm's Chapel dedicated to St Aldhelm, Bishop of Sherborne. The village's parish church of St Nicholas of Myra dates from the 12th century and is Grade I listed.

The village is also well known for the Square and Compass, a Grade II listed public house, which has operated since 1793. It is on the Campaign for Real Ale's National Inventory of Historic Pub Interiors. It holds an annual week-long stone carving festival and accommodates a small museum exhibiting fossils and other local artefacts.

Miscellaneous

In 2004, local fishermen were targeted with a sabotage campaign by the so-called "Lobster Liberation Front", a fringe animal rights group operating in the area.
The tombs of Benjamin Jesty, a farmer who is reported to have vaccinated his family against smallpox having made the same observations as Edward Jenner and a while earlier, but kept quiet about it, and his wife are side by side in the churchyard. Jesty's family may be the first recorded deliberate attempt to induce immunity to Smallpox using cowpox, or it may have been a more widespread activity prior to its systematisation.
Sculptors Sir Anthony Caro (1924-2013) and Mary Spencer Watson (1913-2006) are buried in the village's churchyard.
The first President of the Supreme Court of the United Kingdom Lord Phillips, took Worth Matravers as part of his title.

References

External links

 Purbeck Radar Museum Trust website – early radar development at Worth Matravers 1940–1942
 Worth Matravers Parish Council

Isle of Purbeck
Villages in Dorset
Jurassic Coast